Alexander Gibbs, Jr. (February 22, 1941 – July 12, 2021) was an American professional football coach who was a longtime offensive line coach in the National Football League (NFL). He coached college football for over a decade before joining the Denver Broncos of the NFL in 1984. He won two Super Bowls with Denver.

Gibbs was a well known proponent of the zone blocking scheme and popularized its use while he was offensive line coach of the Broncos. Denver became famous at that time for its use of smaller and more agile offensive linemen and the success of its running backs, most notably Terrell Davis.  Gibbs was to enter his first season on Pete Carroll's Seattle Seahawks staff as the assistant head coach and offensive line coach in 2010, but announced his unexpected retirement a week before the start of the NFL's 2010 regular season.  In May 2013 he returned to the Denver Broncos in a consultant role for one year.

Gibbs died at his home in Phoenix, Arizona, on July 12, 2021.

References

People from Burke County, North Carolina
American football running backs
American football defensive backs
Davidson College alumni
Duke Blue Devils football coaches
Kentucky Wildcats football coaches
West Virginia Mountaineers football coaches
Ohio State Buckeyes football coaches
Auburn Tigers football coaches
Georgia Bulldogs football coaches
Denver Broncos coaches
Los Angeles Raiders coaches
San Diego Chargers coaches
Indianapolis Colts coaches
Kansas City Chiefs coaches
Atlanta Falcons coaches
Houston Texans coaches
Seattle Seahawks coaches
1941 births
2021 deaths